Alexander Alexandrovich Vasilevski, also known as Alexander Vasilevskii (born January 8, 1975) is a Ukrainian retired professional ice hockey player. He played 4 games in the National Hockey League with the St. Louis Blues during the 1995–96 and 1996–97 seasons. The rest of his career, which lasted from 1995 to 2010, was mainly spent in European leagues. He was selected by the St. Louis Blues in the 11th round (271st overall) of the 1993 NHL Entry Draft.

Playing career
Vasilevski played four seasons of major junior hockey (1992–1995) in the Western Hockey League (WHL) with the Victoria Cougars, Prince George Cougars, and the Brandon Wheat Kings. He turned professional with the 1995–96 season, playing 69 games in the  American Hockey League (AHL) with the Worcester IceCats, and one game in the NHL with the St. Louis Blues. The following season he was given three more games with the St. Louis Blues, but failed to stick with the NHL team.

Vasilevski went on to play 14 seasons in North America and Europe before retiring following the 2009–10 season which he played with HC Bilyy Bars Brovary in the Ukrainian Professional Hockey League.

Career statistics

Regular season and playoffs

References

External links 

1975 births
Living people
Bilyi Bars Bila Tserkva players
Brandon Wheat Kings players
Detroit Vipers players
Grand Rapids Griffins (IHL) players
Hamilton Bulldogs (AHL) players
HC Berkut players
HC Mechel players
HK Gomel players
HK Mogilev players
Krylya Sovetov Moscow players
Long Beach Ice Dogs (IHL) players
Muskegon Fury players
Olimpiya Kirovo-Chepetsk players
Prince George Cougars players
St. Louis Blues draft picks
St. Louis Blues players
Severstal Cherepovets players
Sokil Kyiv players
Sportspeople from Kyiv
Ukrainian expatriate sportspeople in Canada
Ukrainian expatriate sportspeople in the United States
Ukrainian ice hockey right wingers
Victoria Cougars (WHL) players
Worcester IceCats players
Ukrainian expatriate ice hockey people
Ukrainian expatriate sportspeople in Belarus
Expatriate ice hockey players in the United States
Expatriate ice hockey players in Canada
Expatriate ice hockey players in Belarus
Ukrainian expatriate sportspeople in Russia
Ukrainian expatriate sportspeople in Austria
Expatriate ice hockey players in Russia
Expatriate ice hockey players in Austria